Levasseur is a French surname. Notable people with the surname include:
 André-Nicolas or Auguste Levasseur, French author and secretary for Gilbert du Motier, Marquis de Lafayette
 Grégory Levasseur (born 1979), French filmmaker
 Jon Levasseur, former member of Canadian death metal band Cryptopsy
 Joseph Le Vasseur Borgia (1773–1839), a lawyer, newspaper owner and political figure in Lower Canada
 Karl Levasseur (1903-1961), pioneer in Austrian stenography
 Nickolas Levasseur, Democratic member of the New Hampshire House of Representatives
 Nicolas Levasseur (1791–1871), French bass, particularly associated with Rossini roles
 Noel Le Vasseur (1798–1879), trader and merchant born in St. Michel d`Yamaska, Canada
 Olivier Levasseur (1680 or 1690–1730), pirate
 Pierre Levasseur (aircraft builder) (1890–1941), French aircraft builder
 Pierre Levasseur, colonial head of French Sénégal from 1807 to 1809
 Pierre Émile Levasseur (1828–1911), French economist and son of cartographer Victor Levasseur
 Raymond Luc Levasseur, American revolutionary
 René Levasseur (1747–1834) (fr), French deputy of the National Convention 
 Robert Levasseur (management scholar), professor at Walden University
 Robert Levasseur (1898–1974), French rugby union player
 Rosalie Levasseur or Le Vasseur (1749–1826), French soprano
 Thérèse Levasseur (1721–1801), wife of French philosopher Jean-Jacques Rousseau
 Victor Levasseur (1772–1809), French general under Napoleon Bonaparte
 Victor Levasseur (cartographer) (1800–1870), French cartographer

Fictional characters include:
 Pierre Levasseur, protagonist of the 2006 French film The Valet

See also
 Levasseur (disambiguation)
 Vasseur (surname)

French-language surnames